DWRM (648 AM) Radyo Pilipinas is a radio station owned and operated by the Philippine Broadcasting Service. Its studio and transmitter are located along National Highway, Bgy. Sta Monica, Puerto Princesa.

The radio station was established through the effort and initiative of then House Speaker Ramon V. Mitra, Jr, congressman of the 2nd district of Palawan with the aim of bringing the government to the far flung areas of the province using the airwaves. It was also dubbed DWRM in honor of the late speaker's effort to emphasize the ultimate purpose of the station that is to serve the people.

References

Radio stations in Puerto Princesa
Radio stations established in 1991
Philippine Broadcasting Service